Whitacre Tower, also known as One AT&T Plaza, and formerly known as One Bell Plaza, is a 37-story high-rise in Downtown Dallas, built adjacent to the Akard Street Mall in 1984.

The building is the headquarters for AT&T and Southwestern Bell Telephone, which operates as "AT&T Southwest". It is 580 feet (177 m) tall, the 13th-tallest building in the city.

History
The Whitacre Tower was built in 1982.

AT&T moved its headquarters to the tower from a location in San Antonio, Texas, in 2008. Mayor of Dallas Tom Leppert said then he hoped AT&T would stay in the central city. Most of the around 700 workers moving to the Whitacre Tower were moved into 17 floors that were being refurbished. In August 2008, AT&T sold the tower to Icahn Enterprises and took a long-term lease in the tower.

AT&T renamed the tower the "Whitacre Tower" after Edward Whitacre, Jr., a former chairman and chief executive, in 2009. AT&T moved Spirit of Communication, a gold statue, from its Bedminster, New Jersey, offices to the Whitacre Tower.

See also

List of tallest buildings in Dallas

References

Skyscraper office buildings in Dallas
Downtown Dallas
Telecommunications company headquarters in the United States
AT&T buildings
Office buildings completed in 1984
1984 establishments in Texas